Patrick Pentz (born 2 January 1997) is an Austrian professional footballer who plays as a goalkeeper for German  club Bayer Leverkusen and the Austria national team.

Club career
Pentz made his professional debut for Austria Wien in a 3–0 win over Sturm Graz on 15 May 2016.

On 9 July 2022, Pentz signed a three-year contract with Reims in France. He began the 2022–23 Ligue 1 season as the starting goalkeeper for Reims before losing the position to Yehvann Diouf.

On 27 January 2023, Pentz moved to German club Bayer Leverkusen on a 2.5-year contract.

International career
Pentz represented Austria at the U17, U18 and U21 levels. He made his debut for the senior national team on 29 March 2022, coming on as a substitute in the friendly match against Scotland.

Career statistics

Club

Honours
Individual
 Austrian Bundesliga Team of the Year: 2020–21, 2021–22

References

External links
 Austrian Bundesliga Profile

1997 births
Living people
Footballers from Salzburg
Austrian footballers
Association football goalkeepers
Austria youth international footballers
Austria under-21 international footballers
Austria international footballers
Austrian Football Bundesliga players
Ligue 1 players
FK Austria Wien players
Stade de Reims players
Bayer 04 Leverkusen players
Austrian expatriate footballers
Austrian expatriate sportspeople in France
Expatriate footballers in France
Austrian expatriate sportspeople in Germany
Expatriate footballers in Germany